O – Part Two of L.O.V.E is the second EP in Sofia Talvik's four album saga, and was released 2011. Along with three new songs, the album includes a new performance of King of the Willow Tree, which originally appeared in Florida.

Track listing
Glow  4:12
Awfully Aware  3:49
The War  3:53
King of the Willow Tree  3:38

References
O - Part Two of L.O.V.E information

2011 EPs
Sofia Talvik albums